Corruption is pervasive at all levels of government in Iraq. In 2021, President Barham Salih said that $150 billion of oil money had been stolen and smuggled out of Iraq in corrupt deals since the 2003 U.S. invasion. The Iraqi economy is predominantly a cash economy, making it almost impossible to trace the amount or the path the money follows.

From 2013 to 2021, Transparency International's Corruption Perceptions Index showed a perception that the Iraqi public sector was seriously corrupt but improving. On a scale of 0 to 100, where low numbers signify a perception of wide corruption, Iraq's score remained constant or rose every year, rising from 16 to 23 over the eight years.  For comparison, in 2021 the lowest and highest scores in the Index were 11 and 88. When the 180 countries of the 2021 Index were ranked by score, Iraq's score of 23 ranked it 157th out of 180 on a scale where the higher rankings belonged to countries perceived to have the most corrupt public sectors.

Dynamics 
Political parties and public servants are considered corrupt, and petty corruption is highly institutionalized in Iraqi society.

Corruption is considered an obstacle for doing business in Iraq, and red tape and inefficiency continue to persist. Government contracting is an area reported to be affected by high-levels of illicit activity, and public contracts are often awarded to companies connected to political leaders. Investors may come under pressure to take on well-connected local partners to avoid bureaucratic hurdles.

Corruption in Iraq is endemic, systemic, and the main threat to Iraq's stability after the defeat of ISIS.

In an Al-Jazeera investigation, residents of Harthiya, a neighborhood in Baghdad alleged severe corruption in the construction sector. The neighborhood has experienced a construction boom since the 2003 invasion. Despite the many construction infractions, only a fraction of the revenue from government fines reaches the state treasury. Iraqi civil servants go around the neighborhood to inspect construction sites. When they spot wrongdoings, such as an extra floor in a building, an agreement is struck with the developer. The public official takes a bribe and in return, the state employee reduces the fine. The contractor pays the ticket and continues the project. Even if the builder pays in full, the fines are too small to deter construction companies when compared to the lucrative construction sector.

In summer 2022, an Iraqi anti-corruption commission uncovered a massive corruption scandal where US $700 million had been stolen from Iraqi state banks. The fraud resulted in a state of chaos and instability in government banking systems.

In October 2022, Iraq’s acting finance minister Ihsan Jabbar shocked the nation by announcing an investigation into US$2.5 billion that had gone missing from Iraq’s General Commission for Taxes, a department in the Ministry of Finance. It was described as "the heist of the century".

In March 2023, Iraq's former Prime Minister, Mustafa Al-Kadhimi claimed in an interview that corruption cost the country US$600 billion between 2003 and mid-2020.

Protests and political impacts 
In 2015, mass protests against corruption were observed in the capital Baghdad and in main large cities. Protesters were denouncing the low quality of public services as well as the regular power cuts the population suffers. They called for the authorities to take action, denouncing them as "corrupt" and "thiefs". The higher Shiite leader at the time, Grand Ayatollah Ali al-Sistani, even called for the Prime Minister Haider al-Abadi to take a strong stance against corruption. These protests became occasional and were organized from time to time from 2015 until 2018.   

Iraqi dissatisfaction with corruption boiled over with large protests in 2018, and again in 2019 as part of ongoing protests, of which corruption in Iraq is one of the main causes, among several.

Corruption in Iraq and subsequent ongoing protests of 2018 and 2019 resulted in then resignation of Prime Minister Adil Abdul Mahdi on November 30, 2019. He was replaced by Mustafa Al-Kadhimi in May 2020.

A 2013 survey by Transparency International indicated that a majority of Iraqis were dissatisfied with the government's efforts in fighting corruption.  In 2019, over 80% of Iraqis were concerned about worsening corruption at the highest levels of government.

Anti-corruption governmental entities 
In August 2020, the Iraqi Prime Minister, Mustafa Al-Kadhimi, announced the formation of a supreme investigation committee called Committee 29 or "Abu Ragheef Committee" (Court order No. 29) to deal with major corruption and criminal offenses. The special commission was placed under the authority of the Office of the Commander-in-Chief of the Armed Forces, and headed by Lieutenant General Ahmed Taha Abu Ragheef.

The Commission of Integrity is an independent entity in charge of investigating cases of corruption committed at every levels of the State. It was created in 2004 by the Iraqi Governing Council. The Commission has known several changes recently, with the replacement of its director in November 2022: Judge Alaa Jawad Al-Saadi resigned as he considered he could not properly pursue his mission at the head of the entity after the commission was subject to campaigns of "distorsion" and "defamation". The Iraqi Prime Minister accepted the resignation and nominated Judge Haider Hanoun Zayer to head the commission.

In November 2022, the new Iraqi Prime Minister Al-Sudani, who expressed his will to make the fight against corruption one of his top priority, announced the creation of a Supreme Anti-Corruption Commission to accelerate the investigation on  major corruption files and the recovery of those wanted.

Recent scandals 
In October 2022, the Federal Commission of Integrity announced it started an investigation on a theft of 3.7 trillion Iraqi dinars ($2.5 billion). Those funds were allegedly stolen from the Tax Authority account. According to several publications based on the declaration of the Iraqi Finance Ministry, the money was reportedly transferred from the account of a governmental agency held by the Rafidain Bank to 5 companies in 2021 and 2022.

Later in November 2022, the Prime Minister Al-Sudani announced that Iraq recovered a part of the money stolen. According to him, one of the businessmen involved in the scandal Nour Zouhair Jassem, who admitted received a part of the funds, gave back around 125 million dollars.

See also 

2015–2018 Iraqi protests
2019–2021 Iraqi protests

References

External links
Iraq Corruption Profile from the Business Anti-Corruption Portal

Iraq
Society of Iraq
Crime in Iraq by type
Politics of Iraq
Iraq